Arthur Ronald Huntington,  (February 13, 1921 – December 28, 1998) was a Canadian politician.

Early life
Born in Vancouver, British Columbia, he was a member of the Royal Canadian Navy during World War II, rising to the rank of lieutenant commander.

Political career
He first ran for the House of Commons of Canada in 1972 for the riding of Capilano but was defeated. A Progressive Conservative, he was elected in 1974 and was re-elected in 1979 and 1980. During Joe Clark's brief term as Prime Minister from 1979 to 1980, he was the Minister of State for Small Businesses and Industry.

He was chairman of the Canada Ports Corporation from 1985 to 1991.

His daughter Vicki Huntington was a member of the Legislative Assembly of British Columbia.

References

External links
 
 

1921 births
1998 deaths
Canadian Anglicans
Members of the 21st Canadian Ministry
Members of the House of Commons of Canada from British Columbia
Members of the King's Privy Council for Canada
Politicians from Vancouver
Progressive Conservative Party of Canada MPs